Klein Time is a 1977 television short film starring Robert Klein and Michael Keaton. The film is about a few comedians doing various voices to a crowd of people. Peter Boyle and Madeline Kahn play themselves.

1977 films